Sebastokrator, was a senior court title in the late Byzantine Empire. It was also used by other rulers whose states bordered the Empire or were within its sphere of influence (Bulgarian Empire, Serbian Empire). The word is a compound of sebastós (the Greek equivalent of the Latin Augustus) and krátōr ('ruler', the same element as is found in autokrator, 'emperor'). The wife of a Sebastokrator was named sebastokratorissa (sevastokratórissa) in Greek, sevastokratitsa in Bulgarian and sebastokratorica in Serbian.

Eastern Roman Empire 
The title was created by Emperor Alexios I Komnenos to honour his elder brother Isaac Komnenos. According to Anna Komnene, Alexios did this to raise Isaac above the rank of Caesar, which he had already promised to his brother-in-law, Nikephoros Melissenos. Anna Komnene compares the rank of sebastokratōr to "a second emperor", and also records that along with the Caesar a sebastokratōr was granted the right to wear a crown (but not the imperial diadem). During the Komnenian dynasty (1081–1185), the title continued to be the highest below that of Emperor until 1163, when Emperor Manuel I created the title of despotes. During that period, it was given exclusively to members of the imperial family, chiefly younger sons of the emperor.

After the dismemberment of the Byzantine Empire by the Fourth Crusade in 1204, the title was adopted in the Latin Empire, the Empire of Nicaea, and the Bulgarian Empire. In Nicaea and the post-1261 restored Byzantine Empire, the title remained one of the highest court dignities, and was almost always restricted to members of the imperial family. The last known holder of the title was Demetrios Kantakouzenos, a ruler in the Peloponnese in the late 14th century.

According to the sources, the distinctive colour associated with the title was blue: the sebastokratōr′s ceremonial costume included blue stockings and blue boots. In circa 1260, according to George Akropolites, the sebastokratores who were members of the imperial family were distinguished from those who were not by having embroidered golden eagles on their shoes. By the time of pseudo-Kodinos in the mid-14th century, the insignia associated with the rank were a skiadion hat in red and gold, decorated with gold-wire embroideries, with a veil bearing the wearer's name and pendants identical to those of the despotēs. He wore a red tunic (rouchon) similar to the emperor's, but without the rizai decorations and the insignia of military power. His mantle (tamparion) was no longer known, but the stockings were blue; under John VI Kantakouzenos, however, when the emperor raised his brothers-in-law Manuel and John Asanes to the rank, he permitted them to wear tamparia and stockings like those of the despotēs. The sebastokratōrs shoes and stockings were blue, with gold-embroidered eagles on red background; and his horse tack was also of blue, his saddle blanket featuring furthermore four red-embroidered eagles. His tent was white with blue decorations. The form of the domed skaranikon, on the other hand, for the sebastokratōr was unknown to pseudo-Kodinos. The sebastokratōr also had the prerogative of signing documents with a special blue ink.

Bulgaria
Kaloyan inherited the title possibly from his father Aleksandar (d. after 1232), a son of Tsar Ivan Asen I of Bulgaria.

Serbia

This title was also adopted in the court of medieval Serbia, under the Nemanjić dynasty, the Serbian Kings and Emperors (1217–1346; 1346–1371).

List of holders

Aleksandar Asen (d. after 1232), Bulgarian prince
Kaloyan (fl. 1259), Bulgarian magnate, held Sredets (modern Sofia)
 Peter, sebastokrator of Sredets, Bulgaria
Hrelja, semi-independent feudal lord in the region of northeastern Macedonia and Rila mountain, Byzantine magnate
Dejan (fl. 1346-1356), Serbian magnate, held Žegligovo and Preševo, and the Upper Struma river with Velbužd (modern Kyustendil)
Alexios III Angelos, Byzantine
John Angelos, Byzantine
Sabas Asidenos, Byzantine and Nicaean magnate
Conon de Béthune, French crusader
Constantine Doukas of Thessaly
John Doukas, Byzantine
Stephen Gabrielopoulos, Byzantine
John I Doukas of Thessaly, Byzantine
John II Doukas of Thessaly, Byzantine
Demetrios I Kantakouzenos, Byzantine
Andronikos Komnenos (son of John II)
Isaac Komnenos (brother of Alexios I), Byzantine
Isaac Komnenos (son of Alexios I), Byzantine
Isaac Komnenos (son of John II), Byzantine
Branko Mladenović, Serbian
Momchil, brigand in Rhodopes
Stefan the First-Crowned, Serbian
Jovan Oliver, Serbian
Constantine Palaiologos (half-brother of Michael VIII), Byzantine
John Palaiologos (brother of Michael VIII), Byzantine
Vlatko Paskačić, Serbian
John Petraliphas, Byzantine
Strez, Bulgarian
Blasius Matarango (fl. 1358–67), Albanian nobleman, prince of Karavasta region

Gallery

References

Sources

 
 
 

 

 
Byzantine court titles
Byzantine imperial titles
Bulgarian noble titles
Greek noble titles
Serbian noble titles